West London Film Studios ("WLFS") is a British film studio and television studio complex located in Hayes, Middlesex.

The studios cater to small and large productions; for films, television shows, TV adverts and photo shoots.

History
Frank Khalid bought the studios in 2005. The studios did not officially open as West London Film Studios until 18 May 2014. Actor Aaron Paul, who played Jesse Pinkman in U.S. TV-drama Breaking Bad, joined Frank Khalid to cut the ribbon at the official opening of WLFS.

Facilities
WLFS has 105,000 square feet of studio-space, including six stages, office-space, prop stores and construction space.

WLFS offers The Hospital Location: the only medical film studios located in the United Kingdom dedicated to providing sets for all things related to medicine. Productions which have used The Hospital Location include Luther, Silent Witness, and Topsy and Tim. Walkers snack foods have also used the facility.

WLFS was also home to MADE Entertainment  which is a charity which creates film, TV & video production projects for marginalised groups.

Productions
Examples of productions shot or partly-shot at WLFS include:

Film

 The Imitation Game (2014)
 Burnt (2015)
 Bridget Jones's Baby (2016)
 Another Mother's Son (2017)
 Freehold (2017)
 The Party (2017)
 The Mercy (2018)
 Yardie (2018)
 2036 Origin Unknown (2018)
 10x10 (2018) 
 All the Devil's Men (2018) 
 Stan & Ollie (2019) 
 The Aeronauts (2019) 
 Judy (2019) 
 Last Christmas (2019) 
 The Gentlemen (2019 film) (2020) 
 The Duke (2020 film) (2020) 
 The Owners (2020 film) (2020) 
 The Father (2020 film) (2021) 
 His House (2020)

Television

 Derek Christmas Special (2014)
 Sky One's Fungus the Bogeyman (2015)
 London Spy (2015)
 The Marriage of Reason and Squalor (2015)
 New Tricks (2015)
 Not Going Out Christmas Special (2015)
 Peep Show (2015)
 Spotless (2015)
 Toast of London (2015)
 Top Coppers (2015)
 Unforgotten (2015)
 You, Me and the Apocalypse (2015)
 Black Mirror: San Junipero (2016)
 Churchill's Secret (2016)
 Cuckoo (2016)
 Horrible Histories (2016, 2017 & 2019)
 The Keith Lemon Sketch Show (2016)
 Mum (2016 & 2018)
 The Nightmare Worlds of H. G. Wells (2016)
 Siblings (2016)
 Bad Move (2017)
 Chewing Gum (2017)
 Episodes (2017)
 The Halcyon (2017)
 Liar (2017)
 People Just Do Nothing (2017)
 Prime Suspect 1973 (2017)
 Strike (2017, 2018 & 2020)
 Witless (2017)
 Killing Eve (2018, 2019 & 2020)
 Kiss Me First (2018)
 There She Goes (2018)
 Small World (2018)
 ITV's Hatton Garden (2019) 
 Island of Dreams, BBC (2019) 
 Turn Up Charlie (2019)
 Hold the Sunset (2019)
 Good Omens (2019) 
 Top Boy (2019) 
 The Reluctant Landlord (2019)
 The Capture (2019) 
 Hitmen (2020) 
 Trying (2020) 
 Sitting in Limbo (2020)
 Ted Lasso (2020 & 2021) 
 Finding Alice (2021) 
 Dead Pixels (2021)
 Cheaters (TBC)

Commercials
Commercials which have been at West London Film Studios through their respective agencies:

 Jacob's
 Ladbrokes Coral
 Cineworld
 Domestos
 Ford Motor Company
 Netflix
 Samsung
 National Lottery (United Kingdom)
 Dunelm Group
 Kit Kat
 BlaBlaCar
 BMW
 Burberry
 Jaguar Cars
 Sounds Like Friday Night
 Cadbury
 The Automobile Association
 BP
 Seiko Epson
 Budweiser
 JD Sports
 B&Q
 Head & Shoulders

Music

Bands or artists which have been at West London Film Studios include:

 Dizzee Rascal
 Charli XCX
 Noel Gallagher
 Newton Faulkner
 Little Mix
 You Me at Six
 WSTRN
 Madonna
 Hannah Diamond
 Krept and Konan
 Chip
 Jme
 London Grammar

External links
 West London Film Studios website
 The Hospital Location: Medical Film Sets & Studios website
 West London Film Studios Facebook Page
 West London Film Studios Twitter Page
 West London Film Studios Instagram Page

References

British film studios
Television studios in London
2014 establishments in England
Buildings and structures in the London Borough of Hillingdon